Survivor: Winners at War is the 40th season of the American competitive reality television series Survivor. This season, filmed in May and June 2019, is the eighth consecutive season to be filmed in Fiji. Celebrating the show's twentieth anniversary milestone, the season featured twenty returning winners from past Survivor seasons competing for a  prize. It was won by Tony Vlachos by a 12–4–0 vote over Natalie Anderson and Michele Fitzgerald, becoming the second two-time winner in Survivor. The season aired on CBS in the United States and Global in Canada from February 12, 2020 to May 13, 2020. Due to the COVID-19 pandemic, the usual live finale for the winner reveal was replaced by a live teleconference between host Jeff Probst, situated in his garage, and the finalists in their respective homes.

This season is the thirteenth season to feature returning players, and the fifth season to feature only returning players. In addition, the season brought back the Edge of Extinction twist first introduced in the show's thirty-eighth season, where voted-out players could opt to stay for a chance to return into the game. The season introduced fire tokens, a form of currency that could be used by remaining players in the game to buy rewards or advantages. This was also the last season to be played over 39 days.

The season was preceded by a retrospective special titled Survivor at 40: Greatest Moments and Players on February 5, 2020, which featured interviews with past players, series highlights and first few minutes of the premiere episode. Winners at War received mixed reviews from critics and fans; commentators praised the season's cast, strategy and memorable moments, but criticized the Edge of Extinction and the editing. The new Fire Tokens twist also received mixed reviews.

Production
The season's theme and players were announced at the finale of Survivor: Island of the Idols on December 18, 2019, revealing that the season would consist of 20 winners from past Survivor seasons. The winner would receive $2,000,000, the largest cash prize ever given out in American reality TV history since The X Factor. 

In addition to the larger grand prize, the payouts for all contestants were increased for this season only: whereas in previous seasons the first contestant eliminated received  with increasing payouts for subsequently eliminated contestants, each returning player in Winners at War was guaranteed a minimum  payment for participating in the season.

Due to the ongoing coronavirus pandemic, the typical live reunion show following the two-hour finale episode did not take place, but instead, the finale ran for three hours, with the final segments featuring Probst remotely from his home garage to video chatting, in a small makeshift set with the final three to announce the winner. All 20 contestants also appeared on screen together at the beginning of the finale from their homes.

Casting
When asked about the possibility of an all-winners season during a 2018 interview with Us Weekly, host and executive producer Jeff Probst stated that it was unlikely, saying, "we have 10 great winners that you'd want to see play again. We don't have 20. We don't have 18. Some of the winners don't want to play again. Some of the greats are like, 'No, we're done.'" In 2019, CBS president Kelly Kahl, who had been a proponent of Survivor since its beginning, suggested the idea again to Probst as a way to celebrate the show's 20th anniversary, and nearly all of the previous winners that were asked accepted the offers to return. Among those who accepted who the production team had considered unlikely to return were married couple Rob and Amber Mariano, who had begun their relationship while competing on Survivor: All-Stars, and Survivor: Micronesia winner Parvati Shallow, who had initially declined the offer as she had recently given birth. Probst has cited those three accepting the offers as the impetus to move forward with the season.

Among those that did not return included John Cochran, winner of Survivor: Caramoan, whom Jeff Probst called "the only one that would have been on the list [where] if he had said yes would probably have a spot on the show" in an interview with Entertainment Weekly. Richard Hatch, winner of the show's first season, Survivor: Borneo, was not included due to his behavior in Survivor: All-Stars in which he competed in a challenge naked and his genitals made incidental contact with another contestant, Susan Hawk, who quit the game shortly thereafter. "Given his history on our show, it did not seem appropriate", said Probst to Us Weekly. "We were in a different time and different culture back then and we would never let him run a challenge naked now." In that same interview, Probst revealed that Survivor: Palau winner Tom Westman was among the castaways who was ultimately cut. According to Inside Survivor both Tina Wesson, winner of Survivor: The Australian Outback, and Mike Holloway, winner of Survivor: Worlds Apart, were included in the mix for casting but cut along the way. Additionally, Survivor: Fiji winner Earl Cole was contacted, but declined due to the birth of his child. Survivor: Panama winner Aras Baskauskas was also contacted but declined, feeling unwilling to leave his children. Survivor: China winner Todd Herzog confirmed on the Talking with T-Bird podcast that he was contacted and considered, but ultimately cut. Survivor Gabon winner Bob Crowley was not contacted to compete. Survivor: Marquesas winner Vecepia Towery confirmed on the Talking with T-Bird podcast that she was not contacted to compete. Survivor: Edge of Extinction winner Chris Underwood was asked to return, but he declined when he received the call just 12 hours after getting married. Survivor: Thailand winner Brian Heidik was not contacted to compete.

While Denise Stapley was the oldest player to play the game, her age of 48 was much lower than many other seasons' oldest players. Nonetheless, the average age of the players for this season is the highest of any other prior season at 37.85 years, beating out Survivor: Nicaraguas average age of 37.6 years, and much higher than the average ages of players from several of the past recent seasons which have skewed younger. Probst said they did not even consider the age of the players when asking the winners to return, though did feel that older players are more interesting to watch, as their maturity brings unique facets to the game.

Game format
All but two of the challenges during the season were based on previous challenges that at least one of the winners had participated in. While this had been done before in Survivor: All-Stars, Survivor: Heroes vs. Villains, Survivor: Cambodia and Survivor: Game Changers, Probst stated that they would not draw attention to who had done previous challenges unless there had been a major event involving it from a prior season.

This season reintroduced the Edge of Extinction from Survivor: Edge of Extinction, the show's thirty-eighth season, wherein contestants who are voted out are taken to a desolate, abandoned beach with fewer amenities than the tribe camps. Contestants on the Edge of Extinction may either wait for an opportunity to rejoin the main game by winning a competition or may choose to leave the game at any point by raising a white sail. Unlike in Survivor: Edge of Extinction, Winners at War contestants were not given the option to decline heading to the Edge of Extinction, though they could raise the mast immediately upon arrival. While the Edge of Extinction had been controversial with fans when it was first used, the element was added for this season as an assurance to returning players of additional chances to get back into the game after being voted out, a concern that had been raised by some when Probst spoke to them about returning. 

This season introduced "fire tokens", a currency that allows players to purchase comfort items, food, and advantages. Probst said that the producers had come up with the idea of fire tokens to emphasize that the game is about creating a society, and these tokens could help in establishing that society. Each player started the game with one token, but could give tokens to other players at any time. When voted out, players must bequeath all of their tokens to remaining players before heading to the Edge of Extinction. Players on the Edge of Extinction were given the chance to win fire tokens by either finding advantages and privately selling them to remaining players, or by completing tasks; the players could then use the tokens at the Edge of Extinction to buy comfort items, food or advantages, including advantages for the eventual challenge to return to the main game.

Contestants

Future appearances 
Natalie Anderson competed on the thirty-sixth season of MTV's The Challenge. Wendell Holland competed on the discovery+ special Beach Cabana Royale. Michele Fitzgerald competed on the thirty-seventh season of The Challenge. Sandra Diaz-Twine competed on Australian Survivor: Blood V Water with her daughter Nina. In 2022, Ben Driebergen, Sarah Lacina and Tyson Apostol competed on The Challenge: USA. That same year, Kwon was a contestant on the USA Network reality competition series, Snake in the Grass.

Season summary
Twenty former winners were divided into two tribes of ten: Sele and Dakal. Players with heavy connections outside of the game were targeted first, including Natalie (aligned with Jeremy) and Amber (married to Rob). The “old-school” players fared poorly early on; even after a tribe swap, every winner from the first half of Survivor's season history was eliminated before the merge. They were all sent to the Edge of Extinction to compete in challenges for the chance to earn fire tokens and sell advantages to players still in the game. The lone exception was Sandra, who raised the white flag and declined to remain on the Edge for a chance to earn her way back into the game.

On Day 19, Tyson rejoined the game in the first battle-back challenge and the tribes merged. Tyson joined players like Tony, Jeremy, and Ben in an effort to keep the big targets (the “lions”) together to eliminate the more under-the-radar players (the “hyenas”). Tony felt threatened by Sarah and Sophie's growing connection, fearing that Sophie and Sarah would become a power duo. Tony led the charge of Sophie's blindside. However, the alliance of Tony and Sarah (self-dubbed “Cops R’ Us”) reconciled, and with free agents Ben and Nick controlled the majority of the votes post-merge, with Nick getting blindsided before the Edge of Extinction competition.

On Day 35, Natalie rejoined the game in the second battle-back challenge and found herself and Michele on the outside of a foursome including Tony, Sarah, Ben and Denise. Natalie managed to survive thanks to two idol plays and a final immunity win, assisting in voting out Denise and Ben and forcing Tony to eliminate Sarah in an emotional firemaking challenge. 

At the Final Tribal Council, most of the jurors had positive things to say to all three of them. Natalie was praised for her dominant Edge of Extinction gameplay, using multiple advantages and social connections to further herself in the game. Michele was praised for being an underdog, having many relaxed social connections with the jurors, and winning two immunity challenges when she needed to save herself. Tony was praised for being in Cops R Us with Sarah, having personal connections with multiple people, orchestrating multiple blindsides, and winning 4 immunity challenges. Even though Jeremy was mad at Tony for directly blindsiding too many people, Tony was awarded the title of Sole Survivor in a 12–4–0 vote over Natalie and Michele.

Episodes

Voting history

Notes

Reception

Critical response 

Winners at War received generally mixed reviews from critics, who praised the all-winners cast, gameplay and memorable moments but criticized the return of the Edge of Extinction twist and the editing. The season's all-stars cast was amongst the chief aspects to have been widely praised by television critics. Commentators variously described Tony Vlachos as the "most entertaining" and Michele Fitzgerald as "one of the best social players in the history of the game". Fitzgerald's jury speech drew much attention and has been widely praised; while former contestant Richard Hatch felt that "everything came together" for Fitzgerald in the final speech, Katie Baker of The Ringer highlighted her ability to encapsulate her journey as "excellent". Such former players as Andrea Boehlke, Peih-Gee Law, and David Wright were especially appreciative of her social game and underdog story in an Entertainment Weekly roundtable previewing the finale. Others including Cirie Fields, Eliza Orlins and Jonathan Penner favoured Vlachos' dominant game. Orlins summarised Vlachos saying "he has not had a single vote cast against him, [has placated] even those he has not voted with [and] won multiple individual challenges."

Other than the two finalists, players including Sarah Lacina, Denise Stapley, Kim Spradlin-Wolfe, and Sophie Clarke were also noted for their strong performances. Collectively, the six contestants won 10 of the 13 Player of the Week awards (three each for Vlachos and Fitzgerald, two for Clarke) in fan polls on the website Inside Survivor. Clarke, who was vocal about feeling like a "bottom-tier winner" coming into season, grew increasingly popular during the pre-merge game and was noted for her role in blindsiding the likes of Rob Mariano and Wendell Holland. Several commentators praised her understated style of play and puzzle-solving skills. Writing for Vulture, Martin Holmes called her "a force this season, corralling the numbers, finding idols, and taking charge when necessary".

Holmes gave a positive review of Winners at War. While he stated that it "hasn't been a perfect season" due to the Edge of Extinction remaining "a flawed twist", all old-school players being voted out early, and the editing, he praised the season's humor, emotional moments, the final three, and the eventual winner. Reviewing the finale, he highlighted Vlachos' "high-wire trickery, master manipulation, and control of the votes" and Fitzgerald's "scrappy, socially adept, but under the radar" game. Holmes would later rank this season 13th out of 40. Dalton Ross of Entertainment Weekly gave the finale a positive review, calling Vlachos a highly entertaining player: "no one else mixes game sense and nonsense more than him". He also praised Fitzgerald's tenacious game, survival instinct, and final jury speech, saying that "it’s pretty impossible not to be happy for her". Dalton would ultimately rank Winners at War as the 9th best Survivor season. In 2021, Rob Has a Podcast ranked Winners at War 7th during their Survivor All-Time Top 40 Rankings podcast.

Holmes was critical of the "nightmarish" Edge of Extinction twist; he said: "under normal circumstances, I’d have been rooting for [Natalie Anderson]. But it demonstrates the inherent flaw in the Edge. It punishes those who make it far while rewarding those voted out earlier." Ross also criticized the return of the Edge of Extinction, stating "This isn’t even about fairness or anything like that — although Nick lasting all the way to day 34 and having zero opportunities to earn a single token before the competition certainly is anything but fair — but more about what makes for a more dramatic and intriguing contest."

At the conclusion of the season, the three finalists were added to The Ringer's Hall of Fame of Survivor players, which already consisted of fellow Winners at War contestants Mariano, Sandra Diaz-Twine, and Parvati Shallow. For their performances over the course of multiple seasons, Lacina and Spradlin-Wolfe were also added to the list, as were Jeremy Collins, Tyson Apostol, Ethan Zohn, and Yul Kwon.

Viewing figures

United States

Canada

References

External links
Official CBS Survivor Website

2020 American television seasons
40
2019 in Fiji
Survivor (American TV series) winners
Television series impacted by the COVID-19 pandemic
Television shows filmed in Fiji
Television shows set in Fiji